Yenagoa is a Local Government Area and capital city of Bayelsa State, southern Nigeria. It is located at the southern part  of the country at coordinates .

The LGA has an area of 706 km² and a population of 352,285 at the 2006 census.

The postal code of the area is 561.

The Ijaws form the majority of the state. English is the official language, but Epie-Atissa language is one of the local languages spoken in Yenagoa others such as  Ekpetiama, Gbarian, Buseni and Zarama are Ijaw dialect in Yenagoa LGA.

Bayelsa Airport (Bayelsa Cargo Airport) is an airport located in the Bayelsa State capital of Yenagoa, southern Nigeria. Yenagoa Bayelsa Airport received its first aircraft arrival on February 14, 2019.

Yenagoa is the home of Bayelsa United, a men's association football club that plays in the second-tier Nigeria National League, and Bayelsa Queens, a women's football club in the NWFL Premiership. The two clubs won the 2021 Aiteo Cup for men and women respectively. The men's match took place at the new Samuel Ogbemudia Stadium in Benin City, Benin. Bayelsa United defeated Nasarawa United 4–3 on penalties after the regular period and added time had ended 2–2.

Gallery

See also
Federal Medical Centre, Yenagoa

References 

Local Government Areas in Bayelsa State
State capitals in Nigeria